The Society of International Nature and Wildlife Photographers (SINWP) is a professional photographic organization formed in October 2008.

The association encourages development and discussion relating to photography and promotes the interests of photographers via seminars, workshops, roadshows and industry recognised qualifications. The group provides lists of recognised and qualified professional photographers throughout the world, all of them meeting strict standards of conduct as laid down in the group's rules.

Membership
There are no restrictions on membership, which is international and includes amateur and professional nature and wildlife photographers.

Photographic Competitions
The Society of International Nature and Wildlife Photographers has run a number of photographic competitions specifically for nature and wildlife photographers these include:

SINWP Bird Photographer of the Year 2022  

SINWP 2018 Bird Photographer of the Year  
Great Outdoors  
Nature in Action 
Close-up 
In the Wild 
Living Planet 
Celebrating Nature
Spectacular landscape

References

External links
Society of International Nature and Wildlife Photographers

Trade associations based in the United Kingdom
British photography organisations
International Nature